The table below provides an overview of notable computer-aided design (CAD) software. It does not judge power, ease of use, or other user-experience aspects. The table does not include software that is still in development (beta software). For all-purpose 3D programs, see Comparison of 3D computer graphics software. 
CAD refers to a specific type of drawing and modelling software application that is used for creating designs and technical drawings. These can be 3D drawings or 2D drawings (like floor plans).

See also 

 3D scanning
 CAD/CAM in the footwear industry
 Comparison of CAD, CAM, and CAE file viewers
 Comparison of EDA software
 List of CAx companies

References 

 
 
 
 
 
Computer-aided design editors